Taichung International Airport ,  is an international airport located in Taichung, Taiwan, which is used for both commercial and military purposes.  It is also the third international airport in Taiwan, with scheduled services to China, Hong Kong, Japan, Macao, South Korea, Thailand and Vietnam.

History

Taichung International Airport was constructed during the era of Japanese rule and was named . The United States Air Force (USAF) had been garrisoning the base with two fighter squadrons until the Sino-American Mutual Defense Treaty came into force on March 3, 1955. The airport then expanded in 1954 according to the Sino-American Mutual Defense Treaty, and later renamed Ching Chuan Kang Air Base (CCK) after General Qiu Qingquan. In 1966 the American Air Force established a joint forces air-base at CCK. It was the largest air force base in the Far East at the time, allowing Boeing B-52 Stratofortress bombers to land. During the Vietnam War, CCK became a depot for the USAF. The US Military used CCK and Shuinan Airport to run many of its long-distance Vietnam, Cambodia and Laotian bombing, scouting and cargo transport runs during the Vietnam War era. This base was shut down and most American facilities were removed after the U.S. established diplomatic relations with China in 1979.

Construction of passenger facilities was completed in September 2003 and civilian services began on March 5, 2004, replacing the old Shuinan Airport located closer to downtown Taichung. Ching Chuan Kang Airport has since become the only airport serving Taichung. The airport was promoted to an international airport on January 3, 2017, and renamed Taichung International Airport.

In 2003, with the demand to develop cross-strait and other international air routes from Taichung City, it was decided to transfer the airport from Shuinan Airport (TXG) to RMQ; since RMQ had been for the airbase for the Republic of China Air Force, the Taiwanese Civil Aeronautics Administration held negotiations with the air force, which led to the air force allowing an edge for building a new civilian terminal. The first terminal was completed in 2004, and all flights moved from TXG to RMQ soon afterwards. In 2008, officials decided to build another terminal. Terminal 2 now handles all international and cross-strait flights, while the older Terminal 1 serves domestic flights.

Airlines and destinations

Statistics

See also

 Civil Aeronautics Administration (Taiwan)
 Transportation in Taiwan
 List of airports in Taiwan

References

External links
 Taichung International Airport Official Website

1954 establishments in Taiwan
Airports established in 1954
Airports in Taiwan
Buildings and structures in Taichung
Transportation in Taichung